The 2021 Men's EuroHockey Championship III was the ninth edition of the Men's EuroHockey Championship III, the third level of the men's European field hockey championships organized by the European Hockey Federation. It was held from 1 to 7 August 2021 at AD Lousada in Lousada, Portugal.

Belarus won their second EuroHockey Championship III title by defeating the Czech Republic 4–0 in the final. Turkey won their first-ever EuroHockey Championship III medal by defeating the hosts Portugal 4–3 in a shoot-out after a 3–3 draw in regular time.

Qualified teams
Participating nations have qualified based on their final ranking from the 2019 competition.

Umpires
The following eight umpires were appointed for the tournament by the EHF:

Preliminary round

Pool A

Pool B

Fifth to seventh place classification

Pool C
The points obtained in the preliminary round against the other team are taken over.

First to fourth place classification

Bracket

Semi-finals

Third place game

Final

Statistics

Final standings

Awards
The following awards were given at the conclusion of the tournament.

Goalscorers

See also
2021 Men's EuroHockey Championship II
2021 Men's EuroHockey Championship IV
2021 Women's EuroHockey Championship III

Notes

References

EuroHockey Championship III
Men 3
International field hockey competitions hosted by Portugal
EuroHockey Championship III
EuroHockey Championship III
Sport in Lousada